Stefano Cusin (born 28 October 1968 in Montreal, Quebec) is an Italian football manager and former player who is the manager of South Sudan national team. He gained international prominence as coach in Europe:  France, Italy, Bulgaria, England; in Africa: Cameroon, Congo and Libya; In Asia:  Saudi Arabia and United Arab Emirates. He was most recently assistant manager of Wolverhampton Wanderers in the Football League Championship and coach of Shahr Khodro in Persian Gulf Pro League.

He speaks Italian, French, and English.

Early managerial career
Cusin had, from the beginning, a varied managerial career. In France and Italy he trained a young players' team for seven years, winning many championships. Soon after he moved to Cameroon. In 2003, in fact, the Cameroonian Football Federation of Africa invited him to organize a workshop for coaches and to train the under-17 and under-20 soccer players teams. He believed that in a country known for its big athletic potential, the correct tactical plan could make it more competitive. He first selected players with high athletic qualities, taught them a variety of technical tactics, and then he worked on their winning positive feelings.

Manager career

Transfers

.

Cameroon 2003–2006
In 2003, in fact, the Cameroonian Football Federation of Africa invited him to organize a workshop for coaches and to train the under-17 and under-20 soccer players teams. He believed that in a country known for its big athletic potential, the correct tactical plan could make it more competitive. He first selected players with high athletic qualities, taught them a variety of technical tactics, and then he worked on their winning positive feelings.

The first experience was a real success and Mr Henry Njalla Quan the Chairman of The Njalla Quan Sports Academy (Acada Sports) based in Limbé asked him to keep on working as the Technical Director of Cameroon for the following three years, in joint venture with one of the best Club in Italy for the youth programme, Empoli Football Club. His team was one of the different National Teams taking part to the different international competitions, Torneo di Viareggio ( Italy) – the best tournament in the world for the under 21, in 2004 (Team Cameroon) and 2005 (Acada Sports).The 11 February 2004 Team Cameroon start the tournament with a remarkable draw against the strong Fiorentina 0–0, and five days later against Modena 1–1. The 27 February 2005 Acada Sports win against the Bulgarian Team Naftex Burgas 3–1, for the first time one team from Africa won this important tournament and on 29 February 2005 there was a draw against Italian giants Inter Milan, played a very amazing game.

During the Viareggio tournament some players of his team have been contacted by different agents. They then decided to leave the team in order to play in different Italian professional clubs like Maa boumsong (Inter Milan), Matute (Udinese); Bayang bang (Bellinzona, Switzerland), Etogo (Greece) and Mapoka (TP 47 in Finland).
During the " Tournoi de l’Amitié 2006" under 21 in Cotonou (Bénin) his team reached the semi-final against Ghana, after having beaten Togo (1–0), Nigeria( 4–0), Ivory Cost(2–1) and drawn with Congo(1–1). He was then contacted by the vice President of the Congo Football Federation and some months later the tournament, where his team played a real good football, the Congo Football Federation proposed him the role of Technical Director for all National teams.

In occasion of the World Cup in Germany 2006, he was filmed by the ARD the Deuch T.V. His Africa story became the little movie "Kick to Goal".

National Team of Congo 2007
In 2007, he signed a two years contract as the National Technical Director of the National Team of Congo. He was responsible of all the National Teams (under 17 to Olympique Team); in 2007 the Congo Team won the under 20 Africa Cup with coach Hudansky and play the World Cup under 20 in Canada. In March 2008 he left Congo because the Federation wasn't paying his salary.

Botev Plovdiv – Bulgaria Premier League 2008
In 2008, he moved to Bulgaria to train the Bulgaria Premier League Team, Botev Plovdiv for a 6-month contract. The Team played a pretty good football during the camp in Italy against important teams of the Italian Serie A (Catania, Siena, Empoli, Foggia). During the game Botev Plovdiv – Catania, played in Assisi on 24 July 2008, he met "the legend of Inter" Walter Zenga, the former Head Coach of Catania Team. In October he was sacked by the club

Al Ittihad Libya 2008–2009

Late 2008s
In November 2008 he signed a year contract for Al Ittihad Team, Tripoli Libya. When he arrived in November, the Team was only fifth classed. Minus 9 from the first .....eight months later: Al Ittihad won the championship, the National Cup and the Libya super Cup...and no defeats at all.In his first official match in the Libyan league he win 5–1 against Al Whada, making more goal in one match that in all games from the start of the season before is become manager. One of his best match was the derby played on 21 January 2009 against Al Alhy with an audience of 80 000 fan's. Al Ittihad won 2–1 at the last minute playing in ten (Snani took a red card at the 70'). The day after the newspaper article he reported: "For the rest of my life I will never forget this match, my players played like "Old Gladiators" in the Arena and won; thanks to the fan's we didn't feel like playing in 10 players but in 12 instead!".

12 players of his team were then part of the Libyan National Team in March 2009 during the CHAN ( African Cup of Nation) in Ivory Cost.

He also managed the team during the "Arabic Champion Cup" in the semi-final against Club African from Tunisia and the African Champion's League. The Italian newspaper "Corriere dello Sport" selected Stefano Cusin as one of the Italian top Coach in the world, on 2 October 2009.

The international Magazine "soccer coaching international" from the Netherlands dedicated him an article 6-page long about his style of work in November 2009.

Arabic Countries success – From Al Nassr (Saudi Arabia) to Al Jazira Club ( United Arab Emirates)

Walter Zenga and Stefano Cusin
As a result of his brilliant experience in the Arabic Countries, Stefano Cusin receive many proposals from Arabic Country and Africa. He was contacted by Walter Zenga, "the Inter legend" in order to train over the Persian Gulf countries. He accepted to be Walter Zenga's assistant to co-work in Saudi for two years.

Al Nassr – Saudi Arabia 2010
In Saudi Arabia, with Al Nassr Riyad he worked from June to December 2010. He started the season on 14 August 2010 winning 1–0 in Najran and beating Al Fateh 7 days after 4–2. When he left the club,on 31 December 2010, the Team was second classed; with the best attack of the league and losing only one game.

Al Nasr Dubai – United Arab Emirates 2011–2012

Appointment and first years
In January 2011, Walter Zenga and Stefano Cusin moved to Dubai to train the Al Nasr Dubai Team.

The 5 June 2011,winning in Kalba against Ittihad Kalba 2–1 and after winning the last 4 match in the league Following a great work, the Team qualified for the Asian Champion's League 2012 for the first time. In May 2011, he extended the contract to another year, until June 2012.

From 6 June to 15 July 2011,Stefano Cusin and Roberto Baggio was a teammate during the Training course in Coverciano, Italian federation and become good friend.
In November 2011 he played in Dubai the "all star" match. A benefit match for the Libyan's Children; part of his team were Materazzi, Zanetti, Madjer, Koller, Muntasser, Nedved, Pires, Fadiga, Zwey, Aboud and Zenga.
On 23 December 2011, during the derby of Dubai against Al Wasl, Cusin met the Argentinian Football Legend Diego Maradona ( Coach of Al Wasl), the match finish 2–2.

In January 2012, During the African Cup of Nation 2012 he worked as the "expert of the African Football" for the famous Italian Calciomercato.com. At the beginning of the competition he declared that the Zambia national team was the serious outsider for the title; Zambia won the African Champion in February 2012.

In the end of season Al Nasr finishes second and qualify Asia Champions League. Stefano Cusin left the club at end of this season

Fujairah SC – United Arab Emirates 2013 
In January 2013, Sheikh Maktoum Al Sharqi, President of Fujairah SC sign a contract with coach Cusin. The target was to reach the UAE Arabian Gulf League for the season 2013-2014 campaign.

For the first 5 months Cusin worked like technical director for the club, for follow the team, scouting players for new season and put the base for a winning team. He involved in structuring the club both youth and senior level team.

After nine months in-charge, the club had won 17 out of 19 matches with qualification for the Final of Division 1 Cup. He decided to leave the club due to disagreement with some of the board members. At end of season the club was promoted to premier leave.

Al Jazira Club – United Arab Emirates 2014 

On 28 October 2013 he signed a contract with Al Jazira Club with his friend Walter Zenga again.

At the end of season Al Jazira Club finished with 3rd position in the league (in October they were 7th position) and qualified for 2015 Asia Champions League.

The club was Runner up in the UAE Cup 2014

In 2014 Asian Champions League Al Jazira Club secured 2nd position in the group stage and qualified for 1/8 Finals after eliminating Iranian giant Esteghlal Tehran Football Club and Al Rayyan from Qatar.

Ahli al Khalil – Palestine 2015

In September 2014, the fans of Ahli al Khalil – the smaller of the two Hebron clubs – didn't have high hopes from the forthcoming season. The club's performances in the West Bank Premier League were unstable, and the team was sailing between the lower and middle places of the table, as per usual in recent years.

In January, after a dull half a season, the technical staff of the club was in a state of chaos: the coach left to Jordan and the team's captain replaced him. But the club's Chairman, Mr. Kifah Sharif, had an ace up his sleeve. He had an unorthodox idea: to sign, for the very first time in the history of Palestinian football, an Italian coach as a club manager.

Stefano Cusin's arrival to the disputed city of Hebron was transformative: in January, the club immediately won its first ever trophy the 'Yasser Arafat Cup' (the local league cup).

Then, Ahli al Khalil were promoted to the Palestinian Cup Final, after a victory against the current holders, Taraji Wad al-Nis, who played at the AFC Cup this season. They won also the last Derby against Shabab (the city rival), becoming one of the best teams in the league.

On 6 August, the West Bank's Ahli Al-Khalil crossed the Gaza Strip, which is blockaded by Israel, for the first time in 15 years to play an historic match with Al-Ittihad Shejaia. Palestinian football has been divided due to the political turmoil in the nation. The football system is divided into the West Bank Premier League and the Gaza Strip League. Each league includes 12 clubs.

A team of 30 people including Italian football manager Stefano Cusin, 21 football players and technical, administrative and press members entered Gaza, after both teams were given the necessary permission while crossing the West Bank and the Gaza Strip to play in the Palestinian Cup.

The first game between the two teams was played at Yarmouk Stadium in Gaza on Thursday and the match ended 0-0. Around 7,000 fans packed Gaza's Yarmouk stadium, which was decked with Palestinian national flags.

The return match, originally scheduled on 9 August, was postponed to 14 August, due irregularities on some visas of four players and three executives of Shujaiyeh. The "historic match" eventually ended and was won by Ahli al-Khalil coached from Italian Stefano Cusin. The team of Hebron beat 2-1 Ittihad Shujaiyeh of Gaza, with the winning goal scored in the first minute of extra-time, on free kick, by Ahmad Maher.

While Ahli Al-Khalil's small stadium was overflowing with fans, hundreds of thousands watched on television and bustling Gaza fell quiet as Shejaia supporters willed their team on from afar in cafes and restaurants. The club in this way has won the Supercup of Palestine and the right of access to the final stages of the Asian Cup.

On 11 September 2015 Stefano and his team gained their fourth trophy in just eight months by beating 3-2 the Shabab Aldahreya opponent, granting him the victory of Supercup for West Bank Clubs.

After this great period Stefano Cusin, has decided to stop for personal reasons his experience by thanking players, staff, supporters and everybody involved in the team.

On 19 October 2015, he enrolled in the "First Class Coach – UEFA Pro" course.

Al Shaab CSC – United Arab Emirates 2015-2016 

Stefano Cusin receives the helm of the team in mid 2015 season and remains as coach until the end of the season.

In his debut vs Dibba Al-Fujairah Club in President Cup, he won an important match by 4–1.

At the end of the season he leaves the club for moving in England with Wolves.

Wolverhampton Wanderers F.C. – England 2016-2017 

On 30 July 2016, the English club announces Stefano Cusin as vice of Walter Zenga. The transfer was possible through Jorge Mendes, the famous football agent. Cusin signs a contract that binds him to Wolves until 30 June 2017.

The debut was against Rotherham, with a draw of 2-2, on 6 August 2016.

The highlights of the season were the home victory on 13 August against Reading (2-0), and away wins on 20 August against Birmingham (1-3) and on 17 September defeating Newcastle (0-2), team that after will win the Championship later that year, in front of an audience of 52000.

In September 2016 Cusin got UEFA PRO License by presenting his thesis entitled "Coaching abroad in the world".

Black Leopards F.C. – South Africa 2018 

On 4 July 2018, the South African team have appointed Stefano Cusin as club's new technical director.

During his first press conference, Cusin said that he will make a contribution to the club in terms of growth and improvement of results, trying to emphasize the African style of play rather than following the European one.

References

External links 
 Stefano Cusin – Official Website Stefano Cusin – Official Website

Living people
1968 births
Canadian people of Italian descent
Canadian soccer players
Italian footballers
Soccer players from Montreal
Canadian expatriate soccer players
Italian expatriate footballers
Canadian soccer coaches
Italian football managers
Expatriate footballers in Switzerland
Italian expatriate sportspeople in France
Association football midfielders
Étoile Carouge FC players
Expatriate footballers in France
Italian expatriate sportspeople in Switzerland
Italian expatriate sportspeople in the United Arab Emirates
Italian people of French descent
Canadian expatriate soccer coaches
Italian expatriate football managers
Fujairah FC managers
Al-Shaab CSC managers